1146 Biarmia, provisional designation , is a metallic background asteroid from the outer regions of the asteroid belt, approximately 32 kilometers in diameter. It was discovered on 7 May 1929, by Russian astronomer Grigory Neujmin at the Simeiz Observatory on the Crimean peninsula. The asteroid was named for the Bjarmaland mentioned in Norse sagas.

Orbit and classification 

Biarmia is not a member of any known asteroid family. It orbits the Sun in the outer main-belt at a distance of 2.3–3.8 AU once every 5 years and 4 months (1,940 days). Its orbit has an eccentricity of 0.26 and an inclination of 17° with respect to the ecliptic.

The body's observation arc begins with its official discovery observation at Simeiz.

Physical characteristics 

Biarmia has been characterized in several observations as a metallic M-type asteroid. In the Tholen classification, it is an X-type asteroid which also includes the M-types as a subgroup.

Rotation period 

The best-rated rotational lightcurves of Biarmia were obtained from photometric observations at the Etscorn Observatory, New Mexico, and at the S.O.S. Observatory in Minnesota, United States. Lightcurve analysis gave a rotation period of 5.468 and 5.4700 hours with a brightness amplitude of 0.22 and 0.20 magnitude, respectively.

Other observations received a lower rating or have since been retracted. Warner's period of 11.514 hours was later revised to 5.33.

Diameter and albedo 

According to the surveys carried out by the Infrared Astronomical Satellite IRAS, the Japanese Akari satellite and the NEOWISE mission of NASA's Wide-field Infrared Survey Explorer, Biarmia measures between 21.59 and 38.567 kilometers in diameter and its surface has an albedo between 0.1436 and 0.455.

The Collaborative Asteroid Lightcurve Link adopts the results obtained by IRAS, that is, a stony albedo of 0.2190 and a diameter of 31.14 kilometers based on an absolute magnitude of 9.80.

Naming 

This minor planet was named for the Bjarmaland mentioned in Norse sagas. This legendary territory probably refers to the Russian region around Arkhangelsk on the White Sea near the Finnish border. The official naming citation was mentioned in The Names of the Minor Planets by Paul Herget in 1955.

Notes

References

External links 
 Asteroid Lightcurve Database (LCDB), query form (info )
 Dictionary of Minor Planet Names, Google books
 Asteroids and comets rotation curves, CdR – Observatoire de Genève, Raoul Behrend
 Discovery Circumstances: Numbered Minor Planets (1)-(5000) – Minor Planet Center
 
 

001146
Discoveries by Grigory Neujmin
Named minor planets
001146
19290507